Rasnick is a surname. Notable people with the surname include:

 David Rasnick (born 1948), American biochemist 
 Rick Rasnick (born 1959), American football coach

See also
 Resnick
 Resnik (surname)

English-language surnames